The international Paul Hindemith Prize promotes outstanding contemporary composers within the framework of the Schleswig-Holstein Music Festival (SHMF). The award commemorates the musical pedagogy of Paul Hindemith, who wrote the composition Plöner Musiktag in 1932 on behalf of the Staatliche Bildungsanstalt Plön. The music prize is endowed with €20,000 and goes together with a composition commission. The prize is presented annually by the Hindemith Foundation, the Walter and Käthe Busche Foundation, the Rudolf and Erika Koch Foundation, the Gerhard Trede Foundation, the Franz Wirth Memorial Trust and the Cultural Office of the Free and Hanseatic City of Hamburg since 1990. From 2010 to 2013, the winner was found by a composition competition. The work of the prize winner is to be premiered within the frame of the Schleswig-Holstein Music Festival.

Prize Winners

 1990 Wilhelm Killmayer
 1991 Ensemble "Assoziation für moderne Musik"
 1992 Wolfgang von Schweinitz
 1993 Jan Müller-Wieland
 1994 Babette Koblenz
 1995 Caspar Johannes Walter
 1996 Wolfram Schurig
 1997 Helmut Oehring
 1998 String Thing (string quartet)
 1999 Olga Neuwirth
 2000 Matthias Pintscher
 2001 Thomas Adès
 2002 Jörg Widmann
 2003 Rebecca Saunders
 2004 Jörn Arnecke
 2005 Lera Auerbach
 2006 Michel van der Aa
 2007 Dai Fujikura
 2008 Márton Illés
 2009 Johannes Maria Staud
 2010 Sascha Lino Lemke
 2011 
 2012 Li Bo
 2013 Maximilian Schnaus
 2014 
 2015 David Philip Hefti
 2016 Anna Clyne
 2017 Samy Moussa
 2018 
 2019 Aigerim Seilova
 2020 
 2021 Mithatcan Öcal
 2022 Hannah Kendall
 2023 Alex Paxton

References

External links
 Hindemith Foundation

Classical music awards
German music awards
Culture of Schleswig-Holstein
Awards established in 1990